Come Out Come Out is the second album by Canadian cuddlecore group cub. Originally released in January 1995 on Mint Records, the album was remastered and re-released with bonus tracks in 2007.

The cover art is by Fiona Smyth.

The track "New York City" was covered by They Might Be Giants on their 1996 album Factory Showroom. The New York City-based band changed some of the landmarks named in the song for their version as they found the original ones hard to decipher.

Track listing
(all songs written by Cub, except where indicated)
"Ticket To Spain" - 2:25
"Everything's Geometry" - 2:38
"My Flaming Red Bobsled" - 2:04
"Isabelle" - 2:33
"Your Bed" - 1:41
"Tomorrow Go Away" - 3:19
"Life Of Crime" - 2:26
"I'm Your Angel" (Yoko Ono cover) - 2:04
"Por Favor" - 1:30
"New York City" - 3:00
"Voracious" - 2:17
"So Far Apart" - 2:47
"Vacation" (The Go-Go's cover) - 2:17

2007 Bonus Tracks:
"Your Bed (Yoyo Version)" - 1:37
"Cast A Shadow (live)" (Beat Happening cover) - 4:33
"Radio Chinchilla (live)" - 3:00
"Go Fish (dance remix)" - 7:04

Personnel
Lisa Marr - vocals, bass, whistling
Lisa G. - drums, yelping, guitar, tra-la-la's
Robynn Iwata - guitar, back-up vocals, drums
Lorraine Finch - organ
Marc L'Espérance - yelps, maracas, tambourine
Kevin Rose - guitar

References

1995 albums
Cub (band) albums